Ion Păun (born 17 February 1951) is a Romanian former wrestler who competed in the 1972 Summer Olympics, in the 1976 Summer Olympics, and in the 1980 Summer Olympics.

References

External links
 

1951 births
Living people
Olympic wrestlers of Romania
Wrestlers at the 1972 Summer Olympics
Wrestlers at the 1976 Summer Olympics
Wrestlers at the 1980 Summer Olympics
Romanian male sport wrestlers
Universiade medalists in wrestling
Universiade gold medalists for Romania
Medalists at the 1977 Summer Universiade
20th-century Romanian people
World Wrestling Championships medalists